Novokaramyshevo (Yañı Qaramış) is a rural locality (a village) in Belsky Selsoviet, Gafuriysky District, Bashkortostan, Russia. The population was 81 as of 2010. There are 3 streets.

Geography 
Novokaramyshevo is located 24 km southwest of Krasnousolsky (the district's administrative centre) by road. Kutluguza is the nearest rural locality.

References 

Rural localities in Gafuriysky District